Rohan Sippy is an Indian film director and producer, he worked as a director in films like Kuch Naa Kaho (2003), Bluffmaster! (2005), Dum Maaro Dum (2011) and Nautanki Saala (2013).

Early life
He is the son of Ramesh Sippy, the director of the Hindi blockbuster film Sholay, and grandson of producer G. P. Sippy. Sippy studied at the Aiglon College in Switzerland and pursued his undergraduate degree at Stanford University.

Personal life

Rohan Sippy was married to Rohena Gera, who also went to Stanford and is now a screenwriter. They got divorced in 2003. He then married Roopa in 2009 and had a baby girl named Inaya on 27 November 2012.

Career
His latest directorial venture was Nautanki Saala! starring Ayushmann Khurrana and Kunaal Roy Kapur was released on 12 April 2013, in India.

|-

Filmography

Television

References

External links

 
 

Hindi-language film directors
Hindi film producers
Stanford University alumni
Year of birth missing (living people)
Living people
Sindhi people
21st-century Indian film directors
Alumni of Aiglon College